The Speaker's Committee on the Electoral Commission (SCEC), or simply the Speaker's Committee, is a body created under the Political Parties, Elections and Referendums Act 2000 to scrutinise the Electoral Commission. Through the committee's members, the commission is able to field questions in the House of Commons in a manner similar to the way ministers do.

Composition
The committee comprises nine MPs: the speaker of the House of Commons (who also serves as its chair), the Secretary of State for Levelling Up, Housing and Communities, the chair of the select committee responsible for electoral issues, As of 22 February 2023, the members of the committee are as follows:

See also
 Parliamentary Committees of the United Kingdom

References

External links
The records of the Speaker's Committee on the Electoral Commission are held by the Parliamentary Archives

Committees of the British House of Commons